Ryan Wylie is a Gaelic footballer who plays for Ballybay Pearse Brothers (where his brothers Brent and Drew play with him), UCD and at senior level for the Monaghan county team. He took over as captain of Monaghan in 2020 and was captaining Monaghan in 2020 when COVID-19 came along. He was captaining them again in 2021 when the community numbed with the under-20 car crash.

He is a brother of Drew. He works as Radiographer in the Mater Hospital and they come from a Protestant family, as Cavan midfielder Gearoit McKiernan cruelly reminded them in the 2015 Dr McKenna Cup, instant red card for McKiernan from Sean Hurson over that, then a ban for bad language over what is believed to be a first, a red card used for racist or sectarian abuse.

References

Living people
Ballybay Pearses Gaelic footballers
Irish Protestants
Monaghan inter-county Gaelic footballers
Radiographers
Year of birth missing (living people)